Thomas Edwin Mostyn (1864 – 1930) was an English artist who worked during the late Victorian era and the early 20th century. Mostyn's works are mainly remembered from his idealistic and romantic garden scenes, as well as various portraits.

Biography 
Although born in Liverpool in 1864, Mostyn was raised in Manchester. He studied at the Manchester Academy of Fine Arts, and had exhibited at the Royal Academy by the time he was 29. He entered the school of Sir Hubert Von Herkomer in 1893, where he created paintings in a realistic style that often depicted the poverty of the working classes. By the end of World War I, Mostyn's style was changing, preferring to depict enchanted garden scenes, which he would become most famous for. He held several solo exhibitions in the Fine Art Society, London during the 1920s. Mostyn died in Manchester, in 1930, aged 66.

Legacy 
Mostyn's works are often offered at auction, even up to today. In September 2003, a work of his (Portrait of a lady, three-quarter-length, in a green and gold dress – see here) sold at Christie's for £39,950, almost 800% more than high-estimate of £5,000, and broke the record price for a work by the artist.

Gallery

References

Further reading 
 Kavanagh, Amanda. Tom Mostyn: 'a full-blooded romanticist' (1989)

External links 

 
 List of works by Thomas Edwin Mostyn sold at Christie's

19th-century English painters
English male painters
1864 births
1930 deaths
19th-century English male artists